The Jede Hot Cup Open was a golf tournament on the Swedish Golf Tour and the Challenge Tour in 1990 and 1991. It was played in Mariestad, Sweden.

The tournament was held at Mariestad Golf Club, on a course along Lake Vänern completed in 1984 where Kasper Hedblom, son of 1990 winner Peter Hedblom, set a new course record of 65 in 2015.

Winners

References

External links
Coverage on the Challenge Tour's official site

Former Challenge Tour events
Swedish Golf Tour events
Golf tournaments in Sweden